Cery may refer to:
 Hospital of Cery, psychiatric hospital of the University Hospital of Lausanne (Switzerland).

Name 
 Denis Čery, Slovak football midfielder.

See also 
 Cerys